Vasily Petrovich Ekimov (1756 or 1758 – 1837), sometimes spelled as Yekimov or Yakimov, was a Russian Empire master founder.

Life
Of Turkish origin, Ekimov's precise date and place of birth are unknown; however, he was captured in Ottoman Turkey aged 12 and taken to Russia. There he became a pupil at the Imperial Academy of Arts in 1764, specialising in copperwork and chased work in 1776 and casting a miniature copy of the Peter the Great Monument in 1777. That copy won a 100 ruble prize from the Academy's Council and he left the Academy as a second-class apprentice in 1779.

He became a master craftsman in 1798 and returned to the Academy to teach casting. Alexander I of Russia put him in charge of casting the Suvorov Monument to designs by Mikhail Kozlovsky in 1799. He was in charge of the Academy's foundry form 1805 to 1837 as professor and academician. In 1805 he also taught bronze-casting and in 1831 he received the title of master founder and chaser.

Works
 Bronze Horseman, St Petersburg - to designs by Étienne Maurice Falconet
 Samson Fountain, Peterhof Palace - to designs by Mikhail Kozlovsky
 Gates of Paradise, copies after Lorenzo Ghiberti, Kazan Cathedral, St Petersburg
 Statues of generals Mikhail Kutuzov and Barclay de Tolly near the Kazan Cathedral, Nevsky Prospect, St Petersburg - to designs by Boris Orlovsky and Samson Sukhanov
 Monument to Minin and Pozharsky, Moscow - to designs by Ivan Martos

References

1756 births
1837 deaths
People from the Russian Empire of Turkish descent
Imperial Academy of Arts alumni
Sculptors from the Russian Empire
19th-century male artists from the Russian Empire
Academics from the Russian Empire
Foundrymen